The Federação Catarinense de Futebol (English: Football Association of Santa Catarina state) was founded on 12 April 1924, and manages all the official football tournaments within the state of Santa Catarina, which are the Campeonato Catarinense, the Campeonato Catarinense lower levels and the Copa Santa Catarina, and represents the clubs at the Brazilian Football Confederation (CBF).

Founding members
The Federação Catarinense de Futebol was founded by the following clubs:

 Avaí
 Figueirense
 Florianópolis
 Internato

Current clubs in Brasileirão 
As of 2022 season. Common team names are noted in bold.

References

Catarinense
Football in Santa Catarina
Sports organizations established in 1924